The coat of arms of the Moldavian Autonomous Soviet Socialist Republic was the official emblem of the Moldavian Autonomous Soviet Socialist Republic in the Soviet Union, and underwent a number of changes over time.

History

Mid-1920s
The first coat of arms was adopted in 1925, when the Congress of the Soviets of Ukraine approved on May 10 the Constitution of the Moldavian ASSR. Thus, in section VII, Article 48, the coat of arms was enacted as follows: -"the Moldavian ASSR has its flag and coat of arms, established by the Central Executive Committee and confirmed by the Moldavian Central Executive Committee of the whole Ukraine."

In the meeting of the Presidium of the Central Executive Committee of the Moldavian ASSR, held on 4 September 1925, was decided that the organizational department of the Committee should organize a contest for designing the coat of arms and state flag of the Moldavian ASSR. The projects were to be evaluated by a committee composed of representatives of the Central Executive Committee, of the Agitprop, of the Popular Commissariat of Education and of the Council of trade unions in Moldova. There were established some prizes worth 50 ruble for the first place, 30 ruble for the second one and 20 ruble for third place.

Because of the lack of surviving documents, the results of the contest and the proposed designs are not known. A description of the selected model (which hasn't been found drawn anywhere) is included in the letter from 21 July 1927 of the permanent representative of the Moldavian ASSR near the Government of the Ukrainian SSR, Malcikov: "from the outside, the coat of arms of the Moldavian ASSR shows a wreath of maize stalks and grapes, with a light blue interior over which is displayed a white label. The label contains the map of the Moldavian ASSR, united with Bessarabia. At the bottom of the map, in the center of the wreath, is rising a sun spreading shining rays. On the sun is represented a red star. The wreath is festooned all over with the slogan "Workers of the world, unite!", in three languages - Russian, Ukrainian and Moldavian." These arms therefore contained irredentist symbolism.

On 21 September 1925, the small Presidium of the Central Executive Committee of the Moldavian ASSR decided the following amendments:

 Where the wreath arms join are to be written the letters "USSR", the abbreviation of the Ukrainian Soviet Socialist Republic in Russian
 The slogan "Workers of the world, unite!" is to be arranged as follows: at the top end of ribbon, to the right and left - in Moldovan, in the middle, to the right and left - in Ukrainian and at the bottom - in Russian.
 The star is to be located on the top of the coat of arms; the diameter of the star is to be smaller and its corners sharper.
 The sun rays are to be prolonged to the end of the blue field
 The proportion between maize and wheat ears is to be established, and leaves are to be painted so that they would look more like grape leaves.
 The proportion between the territories of the Moldavian ASSR on left and the right banks of the Dniester river is to be established.
 The part of the Moldavian ASSR on the left bank of the Dniester is to be colored in red, while the part on the right bank - in black with diagonal red lines
 The letters along the territory are to be arranged so that on the right bank of the Dniester are the letters "R.A.S.", and on the left bank - "S.M."
 The hammer and sickle must have the same shape as the one in the coat of arms of the Soviet Union.

The chosen coat of arms, together with the amendments above were approved by the Presidium of the Central Executive Committee on 19 October 1925. At the same time there was allocated a sum of 45 rubles for making the corrections, and, after 10 November, another 30 rubles for the execution of the drawings of the flag and coat of arms.

The approval of the Central Executive Committee of Ukraine was long delayed. On 23 February 1926, the Regional Moldovan Office of the Ukrainian Communist Party ordered that the map of the Moldavian ASSR was to be removed entirely, and replaced with the hammer and sickle. However, on 2 November 1926 the same office ordered that the problem of removing the map should be look into by the Central Committee of the Party.

In his letter from 1927, Malcikov explains the usefulness of keeping the map of the Moldavian ASSR including Bessarabia on the coat of arms and proposed other minor changes: instead of "USSR" should be written "USRR" (the abbreviation of the Ukrainian Soviet Socialist Republic in the Ukrainian language, instead of Russian), and on the map the names "Moldavian ASSR", "Odessa", "Chişinău" and "Dniester" should be written in the Ukrainian and Moldovan form, not the Russian one.

It is not known which of the options was approved in the end. So far, no graphical representation of such a coat of arms has been found.

Late 1920s / 1930s
In 1927 - 1929 a new coat of arms of the Moldavian ASSR was adopted, similar to the emblem of the Ukrainian SSR between 1919 and 1929. The latter is described as: "the coat of arms of the Ukrainian SSR consists of the golden hammer and sickle on a red background, in the rays of the sun, surrounded by a wreath of wheat ears and the inscription in Russian and Ukrainian: 1. R.S.S.U. and 2. Workers of the world, unite!". In the Moldavian version, R.S.S.U. was replaced by R.A.S.S.M. and the communist slogan was written in Ukrainian and Moldovan languages.

Late 1930s

On 12 July 1936 the draft of the new Constitution of the Soviet Union appeared in the newspapers. It was approved locally by the VIIth extraordinary Congress of the soviets of the Moldavian ASSR, whose work started on 18 November 1936 at Tiraspol. The Congress established a committee that would elaborate the future Moldavian Constitution. On 5 December 1936 the Constitution of the Soviet Union became effective. A month later, the VIIth extraordinary Congress of the soviets of the Moldavian ASSR resumed its work and on 6 January 1937 adopted the new Constitution of the Moldavian ASSR.

According to the Constitution, the coat of arms of the autonomous republic was supposed to coincide with the soviet socialist republic that it was part of. The only additions were the name of the Moldavian ASSR and the communist slogan "Workers of the world, unite!" in the Moldavian and Ukrainian languages on the ribbon. Chapter X of the new Constitution, entitled "The coat of arms, the flag, the capital," stated in Article 111: "The coat of arms of the Moldavian Autonomous Soviet Socialist Republic is the coat of arms of the Ukrainian SSR, which is composed of a golden hammer and sickle on a red background in the rays of the sun, surrounded by wheat ears, with the inscriptions "RSSU" and "Workers of the world, unite!" in the Ukrainian and Moldavian languages, with the addition, under "RSSU" inscription, in smaller letters, of the inscription "Moldavian ASSR" in the Ukrainian and Moldavian languages."

This coat of arms ceased to be valid on the disbanding of the Moldavian ASSR, on 2 August 1940.

Bibliography

 Silviu Andrieş-Tabac, Heraldica teritorială a Basarabiei şi Transnistriei, Ed. Museum, Chişinău, 1998, p. 116 - 119.

See also
 Flag of the Moldavian ASSR
 Emblem of the Moldavian SSR
 Coat of arms of Moldova

Moldavian ASSR
History of Transnistria
Moldavian ASSR
Moldavian ASSR
Moldavian ASSR
Moldavian ASSR
Moldavian ASSR